Super Meat Boy Forever  is an indie platform video game developed by Team Meat for Microsoft Windows, Nintendo Switch, PlayStation 4, PlayStation 5, Xbox One, Xbox Series X/S, iOS, Android and Linux. Originally planned as a mobile-only version of Super Meat Boy, Super Meat Boy Forever was gradually developed into a full-fledged sequel featuring its new auto-runner control scheme and randomly generated levels. Meat Boy's original creator, Edmund McMillen, was not involved in the game's development as he had left Team Meat years prior. The game was released on December 23, 2020, for the Switch and PC, and released on PlayStation 4, PlayStation 5, Xbox One, and Xbox Series X on April 16, 2021. It released on Steam on January 10, 2022, and is scheduled to release on mobile devices the same year. It received mixed reviews from critics.

Gameplay
Super Meat Boy Forever expands on Super Meat Boy's challenging gameplay, as well as the main villain Dr. Fetus. Meat Boy and Bandage Girl's child Nugget has been kidnapped by Dr. Fetus and the couple must work together to rescue her. Both characters can kick and punch enemies and must avoid deadly obstacles to save Nugget. The control scheme uses two buttons. Levels are randomly generated based on the player's skill level by combining seamless premade level segments created by the designers.

The biggest gameplay change introduced in Super Meat Boy Forever is that it is an auto-runner, with the player only having control of non-scrolling movement interactions like wall-jumping and regular jumping.

Plot 
Taking place a few years after the original, Meat Boy and Bandage Girl enjoying life while having a picnic with their infant daughter Nugget. Suddenly, Dr. Fetus attacks them both and kidnaps Nugget. When Meat Boy and Bandage Girl came to and discover that Nugget is missing, they both go on a quest to save her.

The duo travel through multiple worlds to catch Fetus only for him to get away or ambush them, leaving them to fight multiple bosses like a telekinesis brain monster named Manic, a massive machine dubbed “Big Slugger”, or his lair’s security system. During their pursuit, a group of animals, lead by a squirrel from the forest they had their picnic in, go after Dr. Fetus and take Big Slugger with them and convince Manic to help them take Fetus down, with Manic healing via powering Big Slugger.

After a intense fight in Dr.Fetus’s lair, the duo get trapped in a pile of Dead Meat Boys with Fetus laughing in success until the animals show up and try to take him on only for Fetus to activate the Self-Destruct, destroying Slugger and leaving many of the animals on the brink of death. After seeing this, Nugget begins to cry with Fetus trying to calm her down while Meat Boy and Bandage Girl get out of the pile and go for them. During this, the squirrel leader manages to reach a button that thinks it’s the lairs self-destruct. After coming to the injury’s of the explosion, it lands on a button that destroys all of time, the world, causes Meat Boy and Bandage Girl to age, and turns Nugget and Fetus to atoms.

In the final world (dubbed “The Other Side”), Meat Boy and Bandage Girl (now Meat Ninja and Bandage Ripper) explore and try to find Nugget and Fetus. After find a hologram version of the two, they try and punch it only for it to turn into atoms and reveals God Fetus to the duo, who was made of atoms from Dr.Fetus and a solar system, and fight Fetus in an ultimate battle. After the fight, The atoms of Nugget reform and bring her to the duo and celebrate their victory, with it getting cut short due to Fetus getting new atoms and throwing a heavy rock at them in order to kill them. With the duo hoping the rock up, Nugget gets an idea and shows her pacifier to God Fetus in order for it calm down. It works and the atoms of Fetus merge and present him to the 3 of them, whit Nugget giving the pacifier as a gift. Dr.Fetus, happy due to the gift, then gets punched in  the face and is sent flying through time to before the events in the lab and is KO’D! As a result, the duo de-age, the animals don’t die and thank Meat Boy and Bandage Girl for their actions and head back to the forest, and Nugget is rescued at last.

During the credits, a montage shows Meat Boy, Bandage Girl, and Nugget spending time together on their way back to where they started, and the animal squad and Manic rebuilding the forest. In an after-credits scene, it shows the three of them having their picnic, packing up, and walking towards the sun. Meanwhile, Dr. Fetus (who still keeps Nugget’s pacifier she gave to him) makes many Meat Boy clones via various recordings and arms himself with a plasma shotgun, hinting that he’s not done yet.

Development and release
Development of a mobile successor to Super Meat Boy was announced in February 2012, with the game being rebuilt from scratch, without assets from the original. The game was put on hold a year later, so Team Meat could focus on Mew-Genics. Super Meat Boy Forever was formally announced in August 2014 as a mobile-only spinoff to the original Super Meat Boy. Team Meat founders Edmund McMillen and Tommy Refenes originally teased the project as a "live-action stealth game" called A Voyeur for September, but this was later revealed to be an anagram for Super Meat Boy Forever. After a few years of little to no public updates, Edmund McMillen left Team Meat and began focusing on other projects such as The Binding of Isaac, The End Is Nigh and (the unhyphenated) Mewgenics. Refenes said to not "hold your breath" expecting McMillen to come back after Super Meat Boy Forever is released.

In 2017, Refenes restarted the project as a full-fledged sequel. In the following year several new team members joined Team Meat to help with development. Among the new team members were Kyle Pulver (Lead level designer) (Offspring Fling, Snapshot), Lala Fuchs (Lead Artist) and Paul ter Voorde (Animation director). Ridiculon, consisting of musicians Matthias Bossi and Jon Evans, who composed the music for the PlayStation 4 version of Super Meat Boy, returned to compose the sequel's soundtrack. Refenes explains that even though the game is still coming to mobile, the game was developed primarily as a console game. The new version of the game was revealed at PAX Prime 2017 and was showcased by Nintendo during their Nindies Summer 2017 Showcase, and the PAX demo of the game was well received by the media. The game was scheduled for an April 2019 release, but was pushed back to December 2020.

The game was released on December 23, 2020 as a timed exclusive for the Nintendo Switch and Epic Games Store, with console and Steam versions following in 2021 and 2022. PlayStation 4 and Xbox One versions were released on April 16, 2021.

Reception 

On the review aggregation website Metacritic, the Nintendo Switch version holds a score of 66 out of 100 based on 35 reviews indicating mixed or average reviews, while the PC version holds a score of 70 out of 100 based on 19 reviews.

References

External links

 

2020 video games
Android (operating system) games
Auto-runner games
Indie video games
Linux games
Nintendo Switch games
PlayStation 4 games
PlayStation Network games
Side-scrolling platform games
Single-player video games
Video game sequels
Video games using procedural generation
Video games developed in the United States
Windows games
Xbox One games